Henry Klonowski (March 8, 1898 – May 6, 1977) was a bishop of the Catholic Church in the United States. He served as auxiliary bishop of the Diocese of Scranton from 1947 to 1973.

Biography
Born in Scranton, Pennsylvania, Klonowski was ordained a priest on August 8, 1920, for the Diocese of Scranton.  On May 10, 1947, Pope Pius XII appointed him as the Titular Bishop of Daldis and Auxiliary Bishop of Scranton.  He was consecrated a bishop by Bishop William Hafey on July 2, 1947.  The principal co-consecrators were Bishops George Leech of Harrisburg and Auxiliary Bishop Stephen Woznicki of Detroit.  Klonowski attended the first session of the Second Vatican Council as a council father.  He served as an auxiliary bishop until his resignation was accepted on May 15, 1973.  He died on May 6, 1977, at the age of 79.

References

1898 births
1977 deaths
People from Scranton, Pennsylvania
Roman Catholic Diocese of Scranton
20th-century American Roman Catholic titular bishops
Participants in the Second Vatican Council
Religious leaders from Pennsylvania
Catholics from Pennsylvania
American people of Polish descent